Foum Gleita  is a town and commune in Mauritania along the Gorgol River. The Foum Gleita Dam is located there.

Communes of Mauritania